There was no defending champion as the final of the previous edition was canceled due to the coronavirus pandemic.

Holger Rune won the title after defeating Cem İlkel 7–5, 7–6(8–6) in the final.

Seeds

Draw

Finals

Top half

Bottom half

References

External links
Main draw
Qualifying draw

Trofeo Faip–Perrel - 1
2021 Singles